This list contains the names of fruits that are considered edible either raw or in some cuisines. The word "fruit" is used in several different ways. The definition of fruit for this list is a culinary fruit, that is, "Any sweet, edible part of a plant that resembles fruit, even if it does not develop from a floral ovary; also used in a technically imprecise sense for some sweet or semi-sweet vegetables, some of which may resemble a true fruit or are used in cookery as if they were a fruit, for example rhubarb." Many edible plant parts that are true fruits botanically speaking, are not considered culinary fruits. They are classified as vegetables in the culinary sense (for example: the tomato, zucchini, and so on), and hence they do not appear in this list. Similarly, some botanical fruits are classified as nuts (e.g. brazil nut), and do not appear here either. Even so, this list is otherwise organized botanically.

Pomes 

Pomes include any crunchy accessory fruit that surrounds the fruit's inedible "core" (composed of the plant's endocarp) and typically has its seeds arranged in a star-like pattern.

Drupes 

Drupes represent any fruit that has only one seed (or "stone") or one hard capsule containing seeds.

Botanical berries 

Botanical berries represent any fruit that has a relatively thin exterior, with mostly flesh and more than one seed inside.

Pepos 

Pepos represent any fruit that is covered by a hard, thick rind with soft flesh inside, and seeds filling each locule. Melons are good examples of this.

Hesperidiums 

Also known as citruses, Hesperidiums possess thick and leathery rinds. These fruits are generally sour and acidic to some extent and have a wagon wheel-like cross section.

Aggregate fruits 

Aggregate fruits are a cluster of many fruits produced from a single flower.

Multiple fruits 

Multiple fruits are a cluster of many fruits produced from multiple flowers.

Capsules 

Capsules represent a pod fruit with multiple carpels.

Legumes 

Legumes represent a pod fruit with one carpel.

Follicles 
Follicles represent a single ovary that splits along a single seam.

Plants with edible fruit-like structures 

Plants with edible fruit-like structures are not technically fruit, but are used culinarily as such.

See also

 List of inedible fruits
 Fruit
 List of fruit dishes
 Fruit tree propagation
 Tropical agriculture
 Tropical fruit
 List of culinary nuts
 List of edible seeds
 List of vegetables
 List of culinary herbs and spices
 List of foods

References

External links
 
 
 Rare Fruit Growers of California with Common fruit names
 Fruits of the world   Directory of fruits in French

 
Fruit
Culinary fruits
Types of food
Fruits, Culinary